Michał Jan Wojtkiewicz (born 24 June 1946 in Tuchów) is a Polish politician. He was elected to the Sejm on 25 September 2005, getting 8846 votes in 15 Tarnów district as a candidate from the Law and Justice list.

See also
Members of Polish Sejm 2005-2007

External links
Michał Wojtkiewicz - parliamentary page - includes declarations of interest, voting record, and transcripts of speeches.

1946 births
Living people
People from Tarnów County
Members of the Polish Sejm 2005–2007
Law and Justice politicians
Members of the Polish Sejm 2007–2011
Members of the Polish Sejm 2011–2015